Seguenzia nitida is a species of sea snail, a marine gastropod mollusk in the family Seguenziidae.

Description
The height of the shell attains 5 mm.

Distribution
This species occurs in the Atlantic Ocean off Delaware, USA, at a depth of about 3,700 m.

References
* Verrill, A. E. 1884. Second catalogue of Mollusca recently added to the fauna of the New England coast and the adjacent parts of the Atlantic, consisting mostly of deep-sea species, with notes on others previously recorded. Transactions of the Connecticut Academy of Arts and Sciences 6: 139–294, pls. 28–32.

nitida
Gastropods described in 1884